The Second Treaty of San Ildefonso was signed on 19 August 1796 between the Spanish Empire and the First French Republic. Based on the terms of the agreement, France and Spain would become allies and combine their forces against the Kingdom of Great Britain.

See also
List of treaties
First Treaty of San Ildefonso
Third Treaty of San Ildefonso

External links

The Encyclopedia of World History (2001)

1796 treaties
1796 in France
1796 in Spain
San Ildefonso 2
San Ildefonso 2
18th-century military alliances
France–Spain relations
Military alliances involving France
Military alliances involving Spain
Treaty
18th century in Spain